Ankush is a 1986 Hindi action drama movie starring Nana Patekar, which was written, directed, edited and co-produced by N. Chandra. Made on a modest budget of Rs 13 lakhs, the film grossed Rs 95 lakhs to become a surprise hit of 1986, the year when many big productions starring big stars at that time failed. It was remade in Kannada as Ravana Rajya. The song "Itni Shakti Dena Data" became the theme song of many nationalised banks in India, including PNB.

The film is still remembered for powerful performances from all the actors including  Ashalata Wabgaonkar, Nisha Singh, Nana Patekar and Madan Jain. Nana, in particular, got a lot of attention after the movie was released.

Synopsis
The film tells the story of four lower middle class unemployed young men in Mumbai who feel disconnected with society and are wasting their lives. When new neighbours, a beautiful young girl Anita and her grandmother, change their perspective. The men change their attitude and are trying to blend in with the normal, honest and hard-working society of 1980s India  but Anita is kidnapped and is gang raped at the hands of her employer and his friends. However, the culprits are let off for lack of evidence and Anita commits suicide. Having lost faith in the law of the land, the men take revenge on each culprit, killing them brutally. They are later tried, with all four receiving capital punishment for doing what they thought was right all the while requesting for a stronger law that protects others which cannot be broken ever again.

Cast

Nana Patekar as Ravindra Kelkar aka Ravi
Nisha Singh as Anita
Madan Jain as Shashi
Arjun Chakraborty as Arjun
Mahavir Shah as Gupta
Raja Bundela as Saxena
Dinesh Kaushik as Dave
Rabia Amin as Manda
Gajanan Bangera as Shashi's elder brother
Ashalata Wabgaonkar as Anita's  Grandmother
Suhas Palshikar as Laalya
Sathyajith - as Subhlya
 Ravi Patwardhan - College Principal (Uncredited Role)
Raj Zutshi as a gay man, who is perceived to be in love with Shashi (Uncredited Role)

Production

Chandra started his career with Gulzar in 1971, and later also worked as an editor with him. Influenced by Gulzar's Mere Apne (1971) and bringing in his experiences growing up in Mumbai, Chandra wrote a story of four frustrated unemployed men who roam the streets of Mumbai. He even based the character Ravindra upon the role played by Vinod Khanna in the original. The role of Ravindra was written with leading actor of Marathi cinema, Ravindra Mahajani in mind, however, later when Chandra couldn't afford him, however Nana Patekar was eager to do the same role and signed on for Rs. 10,000.

Reception
Although a small budget film with then unknown actors, the film was a big hit in Mumbai (then Bombay) as it  realistically depicted social conditions prevailing then in the aftermath of famous Mumbai (then Bombay) cotton textile mills strike which rendered thousands jobless. The film stars a very young Nana Patekar, and has an excellent and memorable Bhajan of Indian Cinema : "Itni Shakti Humen De Na Daata" (इतनी शक्ति हमें देना दाता) by Ghanshyam Wasvani.

Writer, Editor, Director and co-producer N.Chandra earned both popular and also critical acclaim for this film.  N. Chandra scored a hat-trick at the box office with his first three films,  Ankush (1986), Pratighaat (1987) and Tezaab (1988). Ankush has earned the status of a cult classic over time, and the ending scene which symbolizes their hanging in front of the India Gate has received much attention. The film is one of the first realistic depictions of inner city adolescents growing up in an atmosphere of social and economic deprivation.

Soundtrack

Remake
The film was remade in Tamil as Kavithai Paada Neramillai and in Kannada as Ravana Rajya.

References

External links
 

1980s Hindi-language films
1986 films
Hindi films remade in other languages
Films set in Mumbai
Films about rape in India
Films directed by N. Chandra
Indian rape and revenge films
Indian films about revenge